In mathematics, a Witt group of a field, named after Ernst Witt, is an abelian group whose elements are represented by symmetric bilinear forms over the field.

Definition
Fix a field k of characteristic not equal to two.  All vector spaces will be assumed to be finite-dimensional. We say that two spaces equipped with symmetric bilinear forms are equivalent if one can be obtained from the other by adding a metabolic quadratic space, that is, zero or more copies of a hyperbolic plane, the non-degenerate two-dimensional symmetric bilinear form with a norm 0 vector.  Each class is represented by the core form of a Witt decomposition.

The Witt group of k is the abelian group W(k) of equivalence classes of non-degenerate symmetric bilinear forms, with the group operation corresponding to the orthogonal direct sum of forms.  It is additively generated by the classes of one-dimensional forms.  Although classes may contain spaces of different dimension, the parity of the dimension is constant across a class and so rk : W(k) → Z/2Z is a homomorphism.

The elements of finite order in the Witt group have order a power of 2; the torsion subgroup is the kernel of the functorial map from W(k) to W(kpy), where kpy is the Pythagorean closure of k; it is generated by the Pfister forms  with  a non-zero sum of squares.  If k is not formally real, then the Witt group is torsion, with exponent a power of 2.  The height of the field k is the exponent of the torsion in the Witt group, if this is finite, or ∞ otherwise.

Ring structure
The Witt group of k can be given a commutative ring structure, by using the tensor product of quadratic forms to define the ring product. This is sometimes called the Witt ring W(k), though the term "Witt ring" is often also used for a completely different ring of Witt vectors.

To discuss the structure of this ring we assume that k is of characteristic not equal to 2, so that we may identify symmetric bilinear forms and quadratic forms.

The kernel of the rank mod 2 homomorphism is a prime ideal, I, of the Witt ring termed the fundamental ideal.  The ring homomorphisms from W(k) to Z correspond to the field orderings of k, by taking signature with respective to the ordering.  The Witt ring is a Jacobson ring.  It is a Noetherian ring if and only if there are finitely many square classes; that is, if the squares in k form a subgroup of finite index in the multiplicative group of k.

If k is not formally real, the fundamental ideal is the only prime ideal of W and consists precisely of the nilpotent elements; W is a local ring and has Krull dimension 0.

If k is real, then the nilpotent elements are precisely those of finite additive order, and these in turn are the forms all of whose signatures are zero; W has Krull dimension 1.

If k is a real Pythagorean field then the zero-divisors of W are the elements for which some signature is zero; otherwise, the zero-divisors are exactly the fundamental ideal.

If k is an ordered field with positive cone P then Sylvester's law of inertia holds for quadratic forms over k and the signature defines a ring homomorphism from W(k) to Z, with kernel a prime ideal KP.  These prime ideals are in bijection with the orderings Xk of k and constitute the minimal prime ideal spectrum MinSpec W(k) of W(k).  The bijection is a homeomorphism between MinSpec W(k) with the Zariski topology and the set of orderings Xk with the Harrison topology.

The n-th power of the fundamental ideal is additively generated by the n-fold Pfister forms.

Examples
 The Witt ring of C, and indeed any algebraically closed field or quadratically closed field, is Z/2Z.
 The Witt ring of R is Z.
 The Witt ring of a finite field Fq with q odd is Z/4Z if q ≡ 3 mod 4 and isomorphic to the group ring (Z/2Z)[F*/F*2] if q ≡ 1 mod 4.
 The Witt ring of a local field with maximal ideal of norm congruent to 1 modulo 4 is isomorphic to the group ring (Z/2Z)[V] where V is the Klein 4-group.
 The Witt ring of a local field with maximal ideal of norm congruent to 3 modulo 4 is (Z/4Z)[C2] where C2 is a cyclic group of order 2.
 The Witt ring of Q2 is of order 32 and is given by

Invariants
Certain invariants of a quadratic form can be regarded as functions on Witt classes.  We have seen that dimension mod 2 is a function on classes: the discriminant is also well-defined.  The Hasse invariant of a quadratic form is again a well-defined function on Witt classes with values in the Brauer group of the field of definition.

Rank and discriminant
We define a ring over K, Q(K), as a set of pairs (d, e) with d in K*/K*2 and e in Z/2Z.  Addition and multiplication are defined by:

Then there is a surjective ring homomorphism from W(K) to this obtained by mapping a class to discriminant and rank mod 2.  The kernel is I2.  The elements of Q may be regarded as classifying graded quadratic extensions of K.

Brauer–Wall group
The triple of discriminant, rank mod 2 and Hasse invariant defines a map from W(K) to the Brauer–Wall group BW(K).

Witt ring of a local field
Let K be a complete local field with valuation v, uniformiser π and residue field k of characteristic not equal to 2.  There is an injection W(k) → W(K) which lifts the diagonal form ⟨a1,...an⟩ to ⟨u1,...un⟩ where ui is a unit of K with image ai in k.  This yields

identifying W(k) with its image in W(K).

Witt ring of a number field
Let K be a number field.  For quadratic forms over K, there is a Hasse invariant ±1 for every finite place corresponding to the Hilbert symbols.  The invariants of a form over a number field are precisely the dimension, discriminant, all local Hasse invariants and the signatures coming from real embeddings.

We define the symbol ring over K, Sym(K), as a set of triples (d, e, f ) with d in K*/K*2, e in Z/2 and f a sequence of elements ±1 indexed by the places of K, subject to the condition that all but finitely many terms of f are +1, that the value on acomplex places is +1 and that the product of all the terms in f in +1.  Let [a, b] be the sequence of Hilbert symbols: it satisfies the conditions on f just stated.

We define addition and multiplication as follows:

Then there is a surjective ring homomorphism from W(K) to Sym(K) obtained by mapping a class to discriminant, rank mod 2, and the sequence of Hasse invariants.  The kernel is I3.

The symbol ring is a realisation of the Brauer-Wall group.

Witt ring of the rationals
The Hasse–Minkowski theorem implies that there is an injection

We make this concrete, and compute the image, by using the "second residue homomorphism" W(Qp) → W(Fp).  Composed with the map W(Q) → W(Qp) we obtain a group homomorphism ∂p: W(Q) → W(Fp) (for p = 2 we define ∂2 to be the 2-adic valuation of the discriminant, taken mod 2).

We then have a split exact sequence

which can be written as an isomorphism

where the first component is the signature.

Witt ring and Milnor's K-theory

Let k be a field of characteristic not equal to 2. The powers of the ideal I of forms of even dimension ("fundamental ideal") in  form a descending filtration and one may consider the associated graded ring, that is the direct sum of quotients . Let  be the quadratic form  considered as an element of the Witt ring. Then  is an element of I and correspondingly a product of the form

This means that this mapping defines a homomorphism from the Milnor ring of k to the graded Witt ring. Milnor showed also that this homomorphism sends elements divisible by 2 to zero and that it is surjective. In the same paper he made a conjecture that this homomorphism is an isomorphism for all fields k (of characteristic different from 2). This became known as the Milnor conjecture on quadratic forms.

The conjecture was proved by Dmitry Orlov, Alexander Vishik and Vladimir Voevodsky in 1996 (published in 2007) for the case , leading to increased understanding of the structure of quadratic forms over arbitrary fields.

Grothendieck-Witt ring
The Grothendieck-Witt ring GW is a related construction generated by isometry classes of nonsingular quadratic spaces with addition given by orthogonal sum and multiplication given by tensor product. Since two spaces that differ by a hyperbolic plane are not identified in GW, the inverse for the addition needs to be introduced formally through the construction that was discovered by Grothendieck (see Grothendieck group).  There is a natural homomorphism GW → Z given by dimension: a field is quadratically closed if and only if this is an isomorphism. The hyperbolic spaces generate an ideal in GW and the Witt ring W is the quotient.  The exterior power gives the Grothendieck-Witt ring the additional structure of a λ-ring.

Examples
 The Grothendieck-Witt ring of C, and indeed any algebraically closed field or quadratically closed field, is Z.
 The Grothendieck-Witt ring of R is isomorphic to the group ring Z[C2], where C2 is a cyclic group of order 2.
 The Grothendieck-Witt ring of any finite field of odd characteristic is Z ⊕ Z/2Z with trivial multiplication in the second component. The element (1, 0) corresponds to the quadratic form ⟨a⟩ where a is not a square in the finite field.
 The Grothendieck-Witt ring of a local field with maximal ideal of norm congruent to 1 modulo 4 is isomorphic to Z ⊕ (Z/2Z)3.
 The Grothendieck-Witt ring of a local field with maximal ideal of norm congruent to 3 modulo 4 it is Z ⊕ Z/4Z ⊕ Z/2Z.

Grothendieck-Witt ring and motivic stable homotopy groups of spheres
Fabien MorelFabien Morel, A1-Algebraic topology over a field. Lecture Notes in Mathematics 2052, Springer Verlag, 2012. showed that the Grothendieck-Witt ring of a perfect field is isomorphic to the motivic stable homotopy group of spheres π0,0(S0,0) (see "A¹ homotopy theory").

Witt equivalence
Two fields are said to be Witt equivalent if their Witt rings are isomorphic.

For global fields there is a local-to-global principle: two global fields are Witt equivalent if and only if there is a bijection between their places such that the corresponding local fields are Witt equivalent.  In particular, two number fields K and L are Witt equivalent if and only if there is a  bijection T between the places of K and the places of L and a group isomorphism t between their square-class groups, preserving degree 2 Hilbert symbols. In this case the pair (T, t) is called a reciprocity equivalence or a degree 2 Hilbert symbol equivalence'''.  Some variations and extensions of this condition, such as "tame degree l Hilbert symbol equivalence", have also been studied.

Generalizations

Witt groups can also be defined in the same way for skew-symmetric forms, and for quadratic forms, and more generally ε-quadratic forms, over any *-ring R.

The resulting groups (and generalizations thereof) are known as the even-dimensional symmetric L-groups L2k(R) and even-dimensional quadratic L-groups  L2k(R). The quadratic L-groups are 4-periodic, with L0(R) being the Witt group of (1)-quadratic forms (symmetric), and L2(R) being the Witt group of (−1)-quadratic forms (skew-symmetric); symmetric L-groups are not 4-periodic for all rings, hence they provide a less exact generalization.L''-groups are central objects in surgery theory, forming one of the three terms of the surgery exact sequence.

See also
 Reduced height of a field

Notes

References

Further reading

External links
Witt rings in the Springer encyclopedia of mathematics

Quadratic forms